Nichols Rock is a rock on the west side of Kinsey Ridge, which lies in the middle of Strauss Glacier in Marie Byrd Land. Mapped by United States Geological Survey (USGS) from surveys and U.S. Navy air photos, 1959–65. Named by Advisory Committee on Antarctic Names (US-ACAN) for Clayton W. Nichols, geophysicist at Byrd Station, 1969–70.

Rock formations of Marie Byrd Land